Daan Vaesen (born 11 July 1981) is a retired Belgian footballer.

Career
In July 2008 he moved from K.S.V. Roeselare to K. Sint-Truidense V.V.

References

1981 births
Living people
Belgian footballers
K.S.V. Roeselare players
Oud-Heverlee Leuven players
F.C.V. Dender E.H. players
K.R.C. Mechelen players
Belgian Pro League players
Challenger Pro League players
Association football defenders
K.S.K. Tongeren players
People from Tongeren
Footballers from Limburg (Belgium)